Takis Kanellopoulos (26 October 1933 – 21 September 1990) was a Greek film director and screenwriter. He directed ten films between 1960 and 1980.

Filmography
 Sonia (1980)
 Romantiko simeioma (1978)
 To hroniko mias Kyriakis (1975)
 I teleftaia anoixi (1972)
 Kastoria (1969)
 Parenthesi (1968)
 Ekdromi (1966)
 Ouranos (1962)
 Thasos (1961)
 Makedonikos gamos (1960)

References

External links

1933 births
1990 deaths
Mass media people from Thessaloniki
Greek film directors